Ostrožac Castle (Bosnian) is a castle located in Bosnia and Herzegovina in the Una-Sana Canton just outside the town of Cazin, in the village of Ostrožac. The castle dates back to the 13th century when Ostrožac was part of property of the noble house of Babonić family. In 1592 it was captured by the Ottoman Turks and established as an Ottoman province of Bosnia. The castle was built between 1900 and 1906 by Major of Bihać Lothar Von Berks as a birthday present for his wife, member of the Habsburg family.

On a session held on 7 November 2013, the Commission for National Monuments of Bosnia and Herzegovina decided to designate Ostrožac castle the National Monument of Bosnia and Herzegovina, in a category of the architectural ensemble. 

The castle hosts a 55-year old event known under the name Colony of sculptors Ostrožac. This event produced number of monumental sculptures carved in bihacite stone, of which more than 150 is left in the castle courtyard as a permanent exhibition, forming the open-air Sculpture Park Ostrožac, unique in Southeastern Europe. According to the decision of the Commission for National Monuments, the sculptures are an "integral and inalienable" part of the architectural ensemble as a wider monument.
Tourism and civic organizations of Cazin and Ostrožac use the castle grounds for shows, concerts, performances and variety of events.
For the time being, the castle complex is being repaired at slow pace and only most urgent repairs have been done, although comprehensive plans for restoration of entire complex exists.

See also

List of castles in Bosnia and Herzegovina
Cazin
Una-Sana Canton

References

Castles in Bosnia and Herzegovina
Ottoman architecture in Bosnia and Herzegovina
Buildings and structures in the Federation of Bosnia and Herzegovina
Cazin
National Monuments of Bosnia and Herzegovina
Medieval Bosnia and Herzegovina architecture